Sigourney Bandjar (born 18 August 1984) is a Dutch former professional footballer. He previously played five years for Excelsior.

Career

Club
In August 2010, Bandjar signed a one-year contract with RKC Waalwijk, before renewing it for another year the following summer.
After leaving RKC Waalwijk in the summer of 2013, Bandjar spent six-months without a club before signing a one-year contract with Kazakhstan Premier League club FC Taraz in February 2014. Bandjar left Taraz upon the completion of his contract. He returned to the Netherlands the following year, playing for amateur club RKSV Halsteren until his retirement in 2019.

Career statistics

Club

Honours

Club
Excelsior
Eerste Divisie (1): 2005–06

RKC Waalwijk
Eerste Divisie (1): 2010–11

Notes

References 

1984 births
Living people
Sportspeople from Paramaribo
Surinamese people of Javanese descent
Surinamese emigrants to the Netherlands
Excelsior Rotterdam players
Feyenoord players
RKC Waalwijk players
FC Taraz players
Eredivisie players
Eerste Divisie players
Kazakhstan Premier League players
Expatriate footballers in the Netherlands
Expatriate footballers in Kazakhstan
People with acquired Dutch citizenship
Association football defenders
Dutch footballers
Dutch expatriate footballers
RKSV Halsteren players